Susan Choi (born 1969) is an American novelist.

Early life and education
Choi was born in South Bend, Indiana to a Korean father and a Jewish mother. She attended public schools. When she was nine years old, her parents divorced.  She and her mother moved to Houston, Texas. Choi earned a B.A. in Literature from Yale University (1990) and an M.F.A. from Cornell University.

Career

After receiving her graduate degree, she worked for The New Yorker as a fact checker. At this job she met her husband, Pete Wells, now the New York Times restaurant critic. They reside in Brooklyn.

Choi published her first novel, The Foreign Student (1998). It won the Asian American Literary Award for Fiction and was a finalist of the Discover Great New Writers Award at Barnes & Noble. Her second novel, American Woman (2003), was a finalist for the Pulitzer Prize in literature. In 2010, she won the PEN/W.G. Sebald Award for A Person of Interest, which was also a finalist for the PEN/Faulkner Award in 2009. In 2014, her fourth novel, My Education, won the Lambda Literary Award for Bisexual Fiction.

With David Remnick, Choi edited an anthology of short fiction entitled Wonderful Town: New York Stories from The New Yorker. Her latest novel is Trust Exercise (2019), which won the National Book Award.

As of May 2018, Choi is working on a novel employing conventions of memoir and reportage that "takes up the question of national identity, and the extent to which it coincides or does not coincide with ethnic and with cultural identity."

She teaches creative writing at Yale University.

Awards and grants
Asian American Literary Award for Fiction for The Foreign Student
 Steven Turner Award for The Foreign Student
 National Endowment for the Arts Fellowship recipient (2001)
Guggenheim Fellow (2004).
 PEN/W.G. Sebald Award (2010) for A Person of Interest
 Lambda Literary Award for Bisexual Fiction for My Education (2014)
National Book Award for Fiction for Trust Exercise (2019)
Sunday Times Short Story Award (2021) for Flashlight

Bibliography

Novels
The Foreign Student (1998), 
American Woman (2003), 
A Person of Interest (2008), 
 My Education (2013), 
Trust Exercise (novel) (2019),

Children's books
Camp Tiger (picture book, illustrated by John Rocco) (2019),

Short fiction 

Anthologies (edited)
Wonderful Town: New York Stories from The New Yorker (2000),  (ed. with David Remnick)
Stories

See also
 Korean Americans in New York City
 Literary license

References

Further reading 

 State by State: A Panoramic Portrait of America, "Indiana" essay.

External links

Excerpt from Susan Choi's fiction in Guernica (guernicamag.com)
Goldsea.com - interview with Susan Choi (2003)
New York Public Library Young Lions Award finalist 2004
link to picture of Susan Choi

1969 births
Living people
20th-century American novelists
20th-century American women writers
21st-century American Jews
21st-century American novelists
21st-century American women writers
American novelists of Asian descent
American women novelists
American writers of Korean descent
Cornell University alumni
High School for the Performing and Visual Arts alumni
Jewish American writers
Lambda Literary Award winners
National Book Award winners
The New Yorker people
Novelists from Indiana
PEN/Faulkner Award for Fiction winners
Writers from Houston
Writers from South Bend, Indiana
Yale College alumni